The 1954 Critérium du Dauphiné Libéré was the 8th edition of the cycle race and was held from 12 June to 20 June 1954. The race started and finished in Grenoble. The race was won by Nello Lauredi.

General classification

References

1954
1954 in French sport
June 1954 sports events in Europe